Joseph Clemente (born 11 August 1987) is an Indian footballer who plays as a defender for Churchill Brothers in the I-League.

Career

Sporting Goa

Joseph Clemente made his debut for Sporting Goa in the I-League on 9 November 2012 against Mumbai at the Balewadi Sports Complex in a match they lost 3–2 and Joseph Clemente was in starting 11.

Career statistics

Club

References

External links 
 Goal Profile

Indian footballers
1987 births
Living people
I-League players
Sporting Clube de Goa players
Association football defenders
Footballers from Goa
Churchill Brothers FC Goa players